Anticipation is the second studio album by American singer-songwriter Carly Simon, released by Elektra Records, in November 1971.

The title track and lead single, "Anticipation", became a smash top 20 chart hit in the U.S.; it was later used as the soundtrack for several television commercials for Heinz ketchup starting in 1973. The song relates Simon's state of mind as she waits to go on a date with Cat Stevens. The album cover artwork is a photo of Simon taken by Peter Simon at the gates of Queen Mary's Garden in London's Regent's Park.

The closing song, her version of Kris Kristofferson's "I've Got to Have You", was released as a single in Australia and reached the Top 10 of the Australian charts in 1972.

Reception 

Writing in Rolling Stone, Stephen Davis gave a glowing review of the album. He called the title-track "a spirited examination of the tensions involved in a burgeoning romantic situation in which nobody has any idea of what's going on or what's going to happen." He also singled out the tracks "Our First Day Together", calling it "a quiet song, lovely and quite enigmatic, with a trace of the minor chord influence of Joni Mitchell," and "I've Got To Have You", calling it "an absolute clincher, an awesome description of the psychic ravages of gone-nuts, know-nothing love. As Carly performs it, it becomes a tour de force, and a stern reminder to those of us who might have forgotten that passion is the ruler of man, not reason. When Carly moans 'I can't help it ... I've got to have you,' we're being shown something so primal and so private that it takes your breath away."

A more recent review from AllMusic's William Ruhlmann continued the praise. Ruhlmann rated the album 3-stars-out-of-5, and stated the album "found her extending the gutsy persona she had established on her debut album." Cash Box described "The Girl You Think You See" as "a chart item any way you look at it," describing it as a "ballad with a rhythmic and lyrical twist."

In 1973, Anticipation was certified Gold by the RIAA, for sales of over 500,000 copies in the United States.

Awards

Track listing
Credits adapted from the album's liner notes.

Personnel

Musicians 
 Carly Simon – pianos, acoustic guitar, all vocals
 Paul Glanz – pianos
 Jim Ryan – acoustic guitar, electric guitars, bass guitar
 John Ryan – double bass
 Andy Newmark – drums, percussion
 Del Newman – horn and string arrangements

Production 
 Producer – Paul Samwell-Smith
 Production Supervisor – Jac Holzman
 Engineer – Michael Bobak
 Editing – Barry Hammond
 Mastered by Lee Hulko at Sterling Sound (New York, NY).
 Art Direction and Design – Robert Heimall
 Photography – Peter Simon

Charts 
Album – Billboard (United States)

Album – International

Singles – Billboard (United States)

References

External links
Carly Simon's Official Website

1971 albums
Elektra Records albums
Albums produced by Paul Samwell-Smith
Albums recorded at Morgan Sound Studios
Carly Simon albums